Kempsville High School is a comprehensive public high school for students in grades 9–12 in the Virginia Beach City Public Schools system. In the western section of the city, the Kempsville High School covers approximately 12 sq. miles and draws students from Kempsville Middle School and Larkspur Middle School.

It is about one mile south of Interstate 264. The mascot is an Indian Chief and the school colors are red, royal blue, and silver.

History
Kempsville High School opened its doors to students in 1924. The present building, which opened in 1966, is the third building to have the name Kempsville High School. From 1959 until 1966, students living in the Kempsville area attended Princess Anne High School. In 1966, when the growth of the city required the construction of neighborhood high schools, Kempsville High School reopened at its current location, serving grades eight through twelve. In 1969, grades eight and nine moved to the newly opened Kempsville Junior High School. The ninth grade moved back to the high school in September 1993. Currently, Kempsville High School houses roughly 1,500 students in grades nine through twelve.

Curriculum
Kempsville High School offers an array of academic courses that include standard courses, honors courses and advanced placement courses. These courses include:

AP Studio Art, AP Art History, AP English Literature and Composition, AP English Language and Composition, AP U.S. History, AP Human Geography, AP U.S. Government and Politics, AP European History, AP Psychology, AP Biology, AP Chemistry, AP Computer Science, AP Environmental Science, AP Statistics, AP Calculus AB, AP French Language, AP Spanish Language, AP Spanish Literature, AP German Language, and AP Latin: Vergil.

Entrepreneurship & Business Academy 
Kempsville High School offers an additional curriculum focused on business, finance, or technology. The intention of the classes is to encourage local entrepreneurship and the creation of companies within the community. Classes range from Entrepreneurial cooking (a home-economics class with a business spin) to Incubator EDU (a business class in which students start their own companies). The Academy is most notable for its claim of producing Associate's Degrees to graduating students who perform a certain course load.

Enrollment

Statistics and demographics

The enrollment during the 2015–2016 school year was 1,456 students.

The average class size in the 2015–2016 school year were: 
22.1 students in English
21.7 students in Math
23.4 students in Science
24.5 students in Social Studies

according to the Virginia Beach City Public Schools Annual School Report Card 2015–2016.

The following is the percentage of students by ethnicity according to the 2015–2016 Virginia Beach City Public Schools Annual School Report Card:
African American: 20.7%
American Indian: 0.5%
Asian: 4.1%
Caucasian: 59.0%
Hispanic: 9.8%
Native Hawaiian: 0.3%
Multiracial: 5.6%
Female students: 47.6%
Male students: 52.4%
Economically disadvantaged students: 33.1%
Gifted students: 9.1%
Students with limited English proficiency: 0.1%
Special education students: 24.5%

Notable alumni

Charles "Chase Chad" Hugo (1992), half of the production duo The Neptunes and N*E*R*D band member
Kenna Zemedkun, solo artist (music)
D.J. Dozier (1983), former professional baseball player and NFL running back
J.R. Reid (1986), former NBA player and 5th pick of the 1989 NBA draft
Steve Jolley (1993), MLS Soccer player
Lady Miss Kier (1981), entertainer, former lead singer of Deee-Lite
Jason Winston George (1990), actor
Anton Gunn (1991), American politician
Andy Kubiszewski (1979), drummer, songwriter, and producer
Nancy Naigle (1979), novelist
Mark Phelps (1984), head basketball coach at Drake University
Bruce Ridge (1982) symphonic bassist, arts advocate, labor leader, chairman of the International Conference of Symphony and Opera Musicians
Al Gettel (1935), baseball player
Evan Nied (2022), the youngest recipient of the Virginia Beach Human Rights Commission Award and First Neptune Prince.

References

External links
 About Kempsville High School
 Kempsville band
 Virginia Beach City Public Schools
 Entrepreneurship and Business Academy at Kempsville High School

Educational institutions established in 1966
High schools in Virginia Beach, Virginia
Public high schools in Virginia
1966 establishments in Virginia